Luis Vigoreaux Rivera (April 12, 1928 – January 17, 1983) was a Puerto Rican radio and television show host, announcer, comedian and producer. Vigoreaux was considered a pioneer in the television business in Puerto Rico, and enjoyed success with several radio and television shows throughout his career.

Vigoreaux was brutally murdered on January 17, 1983. His wife, Lydia Echevarría, was convicted in 1986 of planning the murder, along with hitmen Papo Newman and David López-Watts.

Early years

Vigoreaux was born on April 12, 1928 in the Chupacallos ward of Ceiba, Puerto Rico. He was one of the eight children of Eulalia and Enrique Vigoreaux, a sugarcane worker at Fajardo Sugar Company. His father died when he was young, forcing Eulalia to take charge of the family. When Vigoreaux was 14 years old, they moved to San Juan, specifically Río Piedras. Vigoreaux studied at the Vila Mayo High School.

As a teenager, Vigoreaux found work in a radio station named WIAC (AM), which was managed by Tomás Muñiz (father of Tommy Muñiz). There, Vigoreaux worked on a show called Alma Estudiantil. With the beginning of World War II, most of the professional hosts were enlisted for war, which led to Vigoreaux having the opportunity to work at the station.

During that period, Vigoreaux worked in various areas of entertainment and show business. He served as host, presenter, commentator, among other jobs. He also became the spokesperson for Sello Rojo rice in Puerto Rico, which he did for 30 years.

First years in comedy
Vigoreaux joined Ramón Rivero "Diplo" and José Luis Torregrosa for the radio comedy El Tremendo Hotel. This radio slot enjoyed a large audience for years, and Vigoreaux continued to work as a comedian.

Between 1954 and 1955, he joined fellow comedian José Miguel Agrelot in a theater show that took them to many Latin American communities in the United States. The theater show eventually led to a radio program named Torito and Company, after Torito, the character that Agrelot played. Vigoreaux himself played the character of Don Toribio.

Arrival of television
With the arrival of television to Puerto Rico in 1954, Vigoreaux began his transition hosting a show called El Show Libby's, sponsored by the company of its namesake. He then hosted the show El tren de la alegría.

Vigoreaux later moved to WAPA-TV, motivated by the possibility of working with actor Mario Pabón. They wrote the story for a soap opera, but the project fell through. However, Vigoreaux moved on when he and his second wife, Lydia Echevarria, began hosting the show named La Hora Cero. The show presented many local and international singers, including Celia Cruz, José Feliciano and Marco Antonio Muñiz.

Success in television
The Vigoreaux family became one of the most famous families in Puerto Rico. Some even referred to the Vigoreaux-Echevarria couple as the Lucy and Desi of Puerto Rico, in reference to the marriage of American comedians Lucille Ball and Desi Arnaz.

In 1970, Vigoreaux developed a game show named Sube Nene, Sube. Hosted by Vigoreaux it became one of the most seen shows in Puerto Rican television history. Due to this success, WAPA-TV asked Vigoreaux to produce and host a few more game shows. Vigoreaux responded by creating Pa'rriba, Papi, Pa'rriba, which was a variation of Sube Nene, Sube, and Dale que Dale en Domingo.

With the production and hosting of all those shows at the same time, the Vigoreaux family opened a studio, which they named Estudio CVC. They were also responsible for the transmission of the MDA television marathon in Puerto Rico.

Brief change to Channel 11 and return to WAPA
Vigoreaux later jumped to Channel 11, then named the Perez-Perry Network. He bought the Teatro Nuevo San Juan, from where he started transmitting his new show. But this show was not as successful, and soon Vigoreaux found himself off the air.

In 1980, Vigoreaux went back to WAPA-TV and all his shows were rescheduled. He also became the show host of that station's lunch hour variety show, El Show Del Mediodia, and began playing the role of Pedro Navaja in a play La Verdadera Historia de Pedro Navaja. He would act in that play many times, as well as in a play named Angeles Caidos.

In addition, he returned to the radio with a program named Buenos Dias, Puerto Rico, on radio station WBMJ-AM, Radio Rock, and worked, for a short period of time, as a television reporter for Noticentro 4.

Murder and aftermath
On the morning of January 18, 1983, Vigoreaux didn't show up to work at the radio station or at WAPA-TV, causing his co-workers to worry. When his Mercedes-Benz was found with a burned body inside, it was taken to the medical examiner's office, where it was confirmed it was Vigoreaux.

His death launched a wave of rumors and speculations, and led to one of the biggest trials in Puerto Rico's history. His wife, Lydia Echevarría, was accused formally of his murder, along with Papo Newman and David López-Watts. Allegedly, Echevarría had become jealous of a relationship Vigoreaux had started with actress Nydia Castillo, and had paid Newman and López-Watts to either beat him or murder him. Vigoreaux's body was found gagged, stabbed, and burned inside the car's trunk.

Echevarría has maintained her innocence, but she was convicted to a life sentence in Vega Alta, Puerto Rico. Newman and López-Watts received similar sentences. However, Echevarría and López-Watts only served roughly 12 years in jail. Papo Newman received immunity from the Department of Justice of Puerto Rico to testify in court what happened the night of the murder. Newman did not serve time in prison as an agreement. In January 2000, Governor Pedro Rosselló granted Echevarría a pardon, which was largely criticized by the people.

At the time of his death, Vigoreaux was about to begin another game show, A Millon, which eventually became one of the most popular shows in Puerto Rican television history, under the hosting of Hector Marcano and produced by Vigoreaux's son, Luisito Vigoreaux.

Personal life
Vigoreaux was married twice. He married Rosaura Lorenzana, with whom he had three sons, Luisito, Jorge Enrique and Roberto Vigoreaux. Jorge died in 1962 of leukemia. Luisito has followed his father's footsteps as an actor, comedian, producer, and host. Roberto also worked as an actor, host, producer, and singer. He also served as a member of both the House and the Senate of Puerto Rico.

In 1958, Vigoreaux met actress Lydia Echevarría, while still married to his first wife. After divorcing, they married on February 10, 1960. He and Echevarria had two daughters, Vanessa and Glendalys Vigoreaux. Glendalys committed suicide on July 15, 2008.

See also

French immigration to Puerto Rico
List of Puerto Ricans
List of television presenters P.R.

References

1929 births
1983 deaths
20th-century American male actors
20th-century American comedians
Mariticides
Puerto Rican male actors
Puerto Rican comedians
Television pioneers
People from Ceiba, Puerto Rico
Puerto Rican people of French descent
People murdered in Puerto Rico
Puerto Rican murder victims
Puerto Rican television hosts
Puerto Rican television producers
1983 murders in Puerto Rico
Puerto Rican television journalists